Photothermal optical microscopy / "photothermal single particle microscopy" is a technique that is based on detection of non-fluorescent labels. It relies on absorption properties of labels (gold nanoparticles, semiconductor nanocrystals, etc.), and can be realized on a conventional microscope using a resonant modulated heating beam, non-resonant probe beam and lock-in detection of photothermal signals from a single nanoparticle. It is the extension of the macroscopic photothermal spectroscopy to the nanoscopic domain. The high sensitivity and selectivity of photothermal microscopy allows even the detection of single molecules by their absorption. Similar to Fluorescence Correlation Spectroscopy (FCS), the photothermal signal may be recorded with respect to time to study the diffusion and advection characteristics of absorbing nanoparticles in a solution. This technique is called photothermal correlation spectroscopy (PhoCS).

Forward detection scheme 
In this detection scheme a conventional scanning sample or laser-scanning transmission microscope is employed. Both, the heating and the probing laser beam are coaxially aligned and 
superimposed using a dichroic mirror. Both beams are focused onto a sample, typically via a high-NA illumination microscope objective, and recollected using a detection microscope objective. The thereby collimated transmitted beam is then imaged onto a photodiode after filtering out the heating beam. The photothermal signal is then the change  in the transmitted probe beam power  due to the heating laser. To increase the signal-to-noise ratio a lock-in technique may be used. To this end, the heating laser beam is modulated at a high frequency of the order of MHz and the detected probe beam power is then demodulated on the same frequency. For quantitative measurements, the photothermal signal may be normalized to the background detected power  (which is typically much larger than the change ), thereby defining the relative photothermal signal

Detection mechanism 
The physical basis for the photothermal signal in the transmission detection scheme is the lensing action of the refractive index profile that is created upon the absorption of the heating laser power by the nanoparticle. The signal is homodyne in the sense that a steady state difference signal accounts for the mechanism and the forward scattered field's self-interference with the transmitted beam corresponds to an energy redistribution as expected for a simple lens. The lens is a Gadient Refractive INdex (GRIN) particle determined by the 1/r refractive index profile established due to the point-source temperature profile around the nanoparticle. For a nanoparticle of radius  embedded in a homogeneous medium of refractive index  with a thermorefractive coefficient  the refractive index profile reads:

in which the contrast of the thermal lens is determined by the nanoparticle absorption cross-section  at the heating beam wavelength, the heating beam intensity  at the point of the particle and the embedding medium's thermal conductivity  via .
Although the signal can be well-explained in a scattering framework, the most intuitive description can be found by an intuitive analogy to the Coulomb scattering of wave packets in particle physics.

Backwards detection scheme 
In this detection scheme a conventional scanning sample or laser-scanning transmission microscope is employed. Both, the heating and the probing laser beam are coaxially aligned and 
superimposed using a dichroic mirror. Both beams are focused onto a sample, typically via a high-NA illumination microscope objective. Alternatively, the probe-beam may be laterally displaced with respect to the heating beam. The retroreflected probe-beam power is then imaged onto a photodiode and the change as induced by the heating beam provides the photothermal signal

Detection mechanism 
The detection is heterodyne in the sense that the scattered field of the probe beam by the thermal lens interferes in the backwards direction with a well-defined retroreflected part of the incidence probing beam.

References

 
 
 
 
 
 
 
 
 
 
 
 

Microscopy